The Henry P. Davison House is a mansion located at 690 Park Avenue and 69th Street on the Upper East Side of Manhattan, New York City.

It was constructed for the banker Henry P. Davison in 1917 by Walker & Gillette in the Neo-Georgian style.

Since 1952, the building has been the location of the Consulate General of Italy.

The House was designated a landmark by the New York City Landmarks Preservation Commission in 1970. It was added to the National Register of Historic Places in 1980.

References

External links
 

1917 establishments in New York City
Buildings and structures completed in 1917
Houses completed in 1917
New York City Designated Landmarks in Manhattan
Historic district contributing properties in Manhattan
United States
Italy
Federal architecture in New York City
Georgian architecture in New York (state)
Houses in Manhattan
Park Avenue
Upper East Side
Italy–United States relations